Catherine Hall (born 1946) is a British feminist historian.

Catherine Hall may also refer to:
Catherine Hall (novelist) (born 1973), English novelist
Catherine Hall (nurse) (1922–1996), British nurse and nursing administrator
Catherine Hall, Cambridge
Kathy Hall (born 1956), New Zealand footballer

See also
Kathryn Hall (disambiguation)